The 2014 European Parliament election in Germany was held on 25 May 2014.
Under the Lisbon Treaty, Germany lost three seats and elected 96 members of the European Parliament, instead of the previous 99.

Electoral threshold
The previous electoral threshold of 5% was ruled unconstitutional in 2011, leading the major parties to implement a 3% threshold instead. However the Constitutional Court ruled on 26 February 2014 that this threshold was illegal as well. Under this circumstances a vote share of 0.6% proved sufficient to win an EP seat (result of Die PARTEI) and seven parties won single seats; the seats were allocated according to the Webster/Sainte-Laguë method.

Opinion polling compared with actual result

Results

Post-Poll Alliance

References

Germany
2014